Walter Braddock Hickman (April 11, 1911 – November 28, 1970) was President of the Federal Reserve Bank of Cleveland from May 1, 1963 to November 28, 1970 (died in office).

Biography
A native of Baltimore, Maryland, Hickman graduated from the University of Richmond and earned his Ph.D. in economics from Johns Hopkins University in 1937. He was a member of the faculties of Princeton University, Rutgers University, and the Institute for Advanced Study. During World War II, he was a lieutenant in the U.S. Naval Reserve.

Hickman became a member of the research staff and director of the Corporate Bond Research Project of the National Bureau of Economic Research and published three books on corporate finance.   Hickman conducted some of the earliest and most complete studies of credit risk in corporate bond markets, most notably his 1958 book, Corporate bond quality investor experience.  These credit studies have been credited by Michael Milken for sparking his theories on junk bonds in the 1970s.

Hickman was supervisor of economic studies at the New York Life Insurance Company from 1953–56, joining American Airlines as director of economic research in 1956. He was appointed senior vice president of the Federal Reserve Bank of Cleveland in 1960 and was named president in 1963. Hickman, who always retained a close interest in economic research, was appointed by U.S. President Richard Nixon to the National Commission on Federal Statistics in 1970.

Selected publications

References

Further reading

The Origins and Evolution of Credit Risk Management. Global Association of Risk Professionals, 2004
 Grant, James. Money of the Mind. Rewriting Braddock Hickman, 1994

External links
http://www.clevelandfed.org
Statements and Speeches of W. Braddock Hickman  from 1964 to 1970

1911 births
1970 deaths
20th-century American businesspeople
American financial businesspeople
Businesspeople from Baltimore
Federal Reserve Bank of Cleveland presidents
Johns Hopkins University alumni
Princeton University faculty
Rutgers University faculty
University of Richmond alumni